Nikolay Yankov (born 28 June 1999) is a Bulgarian footballer who plays for Etar Veliko Tarnovo as a midfielder.

Career
On 20 May 2018, Yankov made his First League debut playing for CSKA Sofia. He came in as a substitute for Henrique Rafael in the 1–0 win over Beroe at Balgarska Armia Stadium

Yankov spent next two and a half seasons playing for Litex before joining Hebar Pazardzhik on 17 December 2020.
On 27 June 2021, Yankov signed with Etar Veliko Tarnovo

References

External links
 
 

Living people
Bulgarian footballers
Bulgaria youth international footballers
First Professional Football League (Bulgaria) players
SFC Etar Veliko Tarnovo players
1999 births
People from Veliko Tarnovo
Sportspeople from Veliko Tarnovo Province